The lychnis (Hadena bicruris) is a moth of the family Noctuidae. It is found in northern and western Europe and Turkey. It has an Atlantic-Mediterranean distribution. In the East Palearctic it is replaced by Hadena capsincola.

Description
This species has dark brown forewings marked with two prominent white-bordered stigmata and a white subterminal line. The hindwings are buffish, darkening to brown towards the margin but with a prominent white fringe. Seitz states - Distinguished from rivularis F. by the absence of the violet sheen; the markings white instead of yellow; the upper stigmata not conjoined; a conspicuous black blotch above inner margin near base; hindwing fuscous. Larva dull brown, with darker dorsal line and oblique subdorsal streaks.

Biology
One or two broods are produced each year and adults can be seen between May and September. Flight is from June to July.

The larva feeds on various Caryophyllaceae such as Dianthus, Lychnis, Saponaria and Silene.  The species overwinters as a pupa.

References

Further reading
Chinery, Michael Collins Guide to the Insects of Britain and Western Europe 1986 (Reprinted 1991)
Skinner, Bernard Colour Identification Guide to Moths of the British Isles 1984

External links

Lepiforum
Funet Taxonomy

Hadena
Moths described in 1766
Moths of Europe
Moths of Asia
Taxa named by Johann Siegfried Hufnagel